Dubai Marina Mall is an indoor shopping mall in Dubai, UAE. It is named for its close proximity to Dubai Marina. There are 140 stores, 21 dining options and a Children's play area. It is one of the main shopping malls in Dubai.

History

The mall is part of the Dubai Marina project which has been open since October 17, 2000. The mall is linked to the 5-star Dubai Marina Hotel. It has become a tourist attraction. The entire Dubai Marina development accommodates more than 120,000 people in residential towers and villas.

Family friendly events
The mall regularly hosts child friendly events, like dancing with SpongeBob SquarePants, and Dubai Marina Mall's Indoor Beach Party where children enjoy carnival games, arts, and other games.

The Dome Atrium in Dubai Marina Mall is staged for different family friendly events: in August 2019 the dome was set up for a Play-Doh event where children gathered to experiment.

There are many events happening on the marina walk side in front of the mall, along with several kiosks that open during the winter season. During the month of December the mall is decorated with snow-related decor and child-friendly activities.

See also
Developments in Dubai
Tourism in Dubai
The Dubai Mall
Mall of the Emirates

References

External links
 

1999 establishments in the United Arab Emirates
Shopping malls established in 1999
Shopping malls in Dubai
Mixed-use developments in the United Arab Emirates
Dubai Marina